Crimson tip may refer to
Colotis danae,  a butterfly endemic to Africa, the Arabian Peninsula, and India
Colotis hetaera, a butterfly endemic to Kenya and Tanzania

Animal common name disambiguation pages